Narcotic Thrust are an English electronic dance music duo, consisting of producers Stuart Crichton and Andy Morris. The name Narcotic Thrust is an anagram of "Stuart Crichton".

Their song "Safe from Harm" hit No. 1 on the US Hot Dance Club Play chart in 2002, featuring the lead vocals of Yvonne John Lewis. It was also the first track released on Deep Dish's Yoshitoshi Records to top the US dance chart.

In mid-2004, Narcotic Thrust saw even greater success when their single "I Like It" reached No. 9 on the UK Singles Chart.

The band's third single in 2005, called "When the Dawn Breaks", featured Gary Clark (vocalist from the Scottish band Danny Wilson) on vocals. In 2006, Narcotic Thrust released their fourth single, "Waiting for You" again featuring the vocals of Yvonne John Lewis.

Narcotic Thrust have also made remixes of "The Sound of Violence" by Cassius, "Red Blooded Woman" by Kylie Minogue and "Suffer Well" by Depeche Mode.

Discography

Awards and nominations
{| class="wikitable sortable plainrowheaders" 
|-
! scope="col" | Award
! scope="col" | Year
! scope="col" | Nominee(s)
! scope="col" | Category
! scope="col" | Result
! scope="col" class="unsortable"| 
|-
!scope="row"|Billboard Music Awards
| 2005
| Themselves
| Top Hot Dance Airplay Artist
| 
| 
|-
!scope="row"|DanceStar USA Awards
| 2003
| "Safe from Harm"
| Record of the Year
| 
|

See also
List of number-one dance hits (United States)
List of artists who reached number one on the US Dance chart

References

External links
 

English house music duos
Male musical duos
FFRR Records artists